Márcia Denser (born May 23, 1949) is a Brazilian journalist and writer.

She was born in São Paulo and was educated at Mackenzie Presbyterian University and the Pontifícia Universidade Católica de São Paulo. From 1977 to 1979, Denser was an editor and columnist for the magazine Nova. She has also contributed to Folha de S.Paulo, Interview, Vogue and Salles Inter/americana De Publicidade. More recently, she has directed research into contemporary Brazilian literature at the Idart Cultural Center in São Paulo.

Her first collection of short stories Tango Fantasma (Ghost Tango) was published in 1977. Denser edited and organized two anthologies of erotic short stories by women: Muito Prazer (Much pleasure) published in 1982 and O Prazer é Todo Meu (The pleasure is all mine) published in 1984.

Some of her short stories have been translated into English: "The Vampire of Whitehouse Lane" appears in the anthology One Hundred Years After Tomorrow (Brazilian women in the 20th century) and "Last Tango in Jacobina" appears in Urban Voices, Contemporary Short Stories from Brazil.

Selected works 
 O Animal dos Motéis (Animal of motels), novel in episodes (1981)
 Exercícios para o Pecado (Exercises for sin), short novels (1984)
 Diana Caçadora (Diana the huntress), short stories (1986)
 A Ponte das Estrelas (The tip of stars), novel (1990)
 Toda Prosa (All prose), short stories (2002)
 Os Apostolos (The Apostles), anthology (2002)
 Caim (Cain), novel (2005)

References 

1949 births
Living people
Brazilian women short story writers
Brazilian women journalists
Brazilian women novelists
20th-century Brazilian novelists
20th-century Brazilian women writers
Writers from São Paulo
21st-century Brazilian novelists
21st-century Brazilian women writers
20th-century Brazilian short story writers
21st-century Brazilian short story writers